The Scotland National Korfball Team is managed by the Scottish Korfball Association (SKA), representing Scotland in korfball international competitions. 
It entered in competition in 2007, when the Great Britain National Korfball Team was split in 3 teams: England, Wales and Scotland.

Tournament History

 Before 2007 they played as Great Britain National Korfball Team.

Current squad

 Coach: Johan Oosterling
Assistant Coach: Bas Harland
Team Manager: Graham Robertson

National Team in the 2013 European Bowl

 Official Coach: Johan Oosterling  
 Team Manager: Mary Cooper

See also
Great Britain National Korfball Team

References

External links
Scottish Korfball Association

National korfball teams
Korfball
Korfball teams in the United Kingdom
Korfball in Scotland